Vanessa Martina Zambotti Barreto (born 4 March 1982 in Parral, Chihuahua) is a Mexican of Italian descent judoka.

Early and personal life
Zambotti was born in Parral, Chihuahua. She lives in Mexico City and trains judo in CONADE. Her biggest motivation in her life is her family. She says that they are something like batteries for her. She studied Sports Administration at Universidad del Valle de México and got a degree.

During 2003 Pan American Games she suffered an injury in the right shoulder. The injury did not look serious and she competed with it until summer of 2005, when the pain became unsufferable. A few weeks before 2005 World Judo Championships in Cairo, she underwent surgery and spent a year recovering.

After the 2004 Olympic Games in Athens she changed her trainer, now working with Brazilian Amadeus Díaz de Moura. She can always surprise because her category is a little erratic. Her biggest advantage is her size and experience.

Judo career
She has participated in three Olympic games.

Zambotti won the bronze medal of the over 78 kg division of the 2006 Central American and Caribbean Games.

In the 2004 Olympic Games she won her first match against Tsvetana Bozhilova from Bulgaria, but lost the second match against Barbara Andolina from Italy. The Italian competitor lost her next match, so Zambotti was not involved in the repêchage.

In the 2008 Olympic Games in Beijing she was a medal hope for Mexico as winner of Pan American Games from the previous year, but in her second match she was drawn against the Olympic champion from Athens, Maki Tsukada. She lost this match and finally took 9th place.

At the 2012 Summer Olympics, she was knocked out in the first round, losing to Tong Wen, one of the eventual bronze medalists.

Achievements

References

External links
 
 

1982 births
Mexican female judoka
Judoka at the 2004 Summer Olympics
Judoka at the 2008 Summer Olympics
Judoka at the 2012 Summer Olympics
Judoka at the 2016 Summer Olympics
Olympic judoka of Mexico
Judoka at the 2007 Pan American Games
Judoka at the 2011 Pan American Games
Pan American Games gold medalists for Mexico
Mexican people of Italian descent
People from Chihuahua City
Sportspeople from Chihuahua (state)
Living people
Pan American Games silver medalists for Mexico
Pan American Games bronze medalists for Mexico
Pan American Games medalists in judo
Judoka at the 2015 Pan American Games
Central American and Caribbean Games bronze medalists for Mexico
Competitors at the 2006 Central American and Caribbean Games
Central American and Caribbean Games medalists in judo
Medalists at the 2007 Pan American Games
Medalists at the 2011 Pan American Games
Medalists at the 2015 Pan American Games